The Point of Ayre is the northernmost point of the Isle of Man. The point can be accessed by the A16 road from Bride. Point of Ayre lighthouse, the oldest lighthouse on the Isle of Man, is located here.

The name Ayre comes from the Norse word Eyrr meaning gravel bank. Strong currents offshore cause an ever-changing build-up of shingle, so that the beach changes shape with each tide.

A tidal range at the Point of Ayre provides excellent fishing from the beach. Visitors are attracted by the gorse and heather which surrounds the lighthouse and merges with sand dunes stretching to the south-west, providing cover for rare wild flowers and forming part of a Manx National Heritage Nature Reserve. A variety of land and sea birds visit the area throughout the year, as do a number of grey seals.

See also
 Whitestone Bank
 Strunakill Bank
 Ballacash Bank
 King William Banks

Notes

External links

The Ayre name in Scotland

Headlands of the Isle of Man